The 1974 Cincinnati Reds season saw the Reds finishing in second place in the National League West with a record of 98–64, four games behind the NL West and pennant-winning Los Angeles Dodgers. The Reds were managed by Sparky Anderson and played their home games at Riverfront Stadium.

The Reds' 98 victories were second-best in all of Major League baseball to the Dodgers' 102 victories. The Dodgers had finished in second place from 1970–73, three of those years the Reds won the NL West, (except for 1971, when the San Francisco Giants won). In the offseason, the Dodgers added center fielder Jimmy Wynn in a trade from Houston and acquired future Cy Young Award winning reliever Mike Marshall from Montreal. The Reds added a solid starter in 12-game winner Clay Kirby in the offseason.

Just as they had done the previous season, the Dodgers started hot and built a large lead on the Reds in the division, due largely to their success against the Reds heads-up. The Dodgers won nine of their first 10 games against the Reds. After losing 6–3 to the Dodgers on August 5, the Reds trailed the Dodgers by 7½ games despite a solid 66–45 record. By August 15, the Reds had cut the lead to 1½ games after winning the first two of a three-game set at Dodger Stadium marking 9 losses in 11 games for Los Angeles. In the third game,  Wynn hit a seventh-inning grand-slam to break open a tight game as the Dodgers rallied to a 7–1 victory, which helped keep the Dodgers ahead in the NL West. The Reds would get no closer than two games the rest of the season.

Johnny Bench put up one of his best seasons (career-highs in 108 runs scored and 160 games played, 33 home runs, 129 RBI and 315 total bases) to finish fourth in the NL MVP voting to winner Steve Garvey, runnerup Lou Brock, and Marshall. Wynn was fifth.

The 1974 season also marked the first with future Hall of Fame broadcaster Marty Brennaman. Brennaman replaced another nationally known broadcaster, Al Michaels, who moved to San Francisco to take the same position with the Giants.

Offseason 

 December 3, 1973: Mario Soto was signed as an amateur free agent by the Reds.
 December 4, 1973: Ross Grimsley and Wally Williams (minors) were traded by the Reds to the Baltimore Orioles for Merv Rettenmund, Junior Kennedy and Bill Wood (minors).
 December 12, 1973: Steve Blateric was traded by the Reds to the Cleveland Indians for Roger Freed.
 Prior to 1974 season: Dan Dumoulin was signed as an amateur free agent by the Reds.

Regular season

Season standings

Record vs. opponents

Roster

Player stats

Batting

Starters by position 
Note: Pos = Position; G = Games played; AB = At bats; H = Hits; Avg. = Batting average; HR = Home runs; RBI = Runs batted in

Other batters 
Note: G = Games played; AB = At bats; H = Hits; Avg. = Batting average; HR = Home runs; RBI = Runs batted in

Pitching

Starting pitchers 
Note: G = Games pitched; IP = Innings pitched; W = Wins; L = Losses; ERA = Earned run average; SO = Strikeouts

Other pitchers 
Note: G = Games pitched; IP = Innings pitched; W = Wins; L = Losses; ERA = Earned run average; SO = Strikeouts

Relief pitchers 
Note: G = Games pitched; W = Wins; L = Losses; SV = Saves; ERA = Earned run average; SO = Strikeouts

Farm system

Notes

References 
1974 Cincinnati Reds season at Baseball Reference

Cincinnati Reds seasons
Cincinnati Reds season
Cincinnati